4 is a 2004 Russian drama film directed by Ilya Khrzhanovsky after a screenplay by Vladimir Sorokin. Originally it was conceived as a short film, but turned into a full-length film after four years of work.

Plot
Meat merchant Oleg, prostitute Marina, and piano tuner "simply Volodya" drop into an all-night bar in Moscow, where they are served by a narcoleptic bartender (three plus one is four) while each regales the others with made-up biographies. Oleg claims to work in President Putin's administration, supplying him with bottled water and his wife with liquor; Marina passes herself off as a marketing executive; and Volodya, the infamous lead singer of the rock group Leningrad, as a geneticist who clones twins (two times two makes four, again) in a laboratory that has been engaged in these experiments since the days of Stalin. After they separate, these fantasy realities, especially Volodya's, begin to dominate their everyday lives.

Cast
 Marina Vovchenko as Marina
 Sergey Shnurov as Volodya
 Yuri Laguta as Oleg
 Konstantin Murzenko as Marat
 Alexei Khvostenko as a Man with No Age
 Anatoly Adoskin as Oleg's Father
 Leonid Fyodorov as Sergey
 Andrey Kudryashov as a Bartender
 Shavkat Abdusalamov as a Meat-Processing Plant Manager
 Natalya Tetenova as Sveta
 Irina Vovchenko as Sonya
 Svetlana Vovchenko as Vera

Reception

Awards
The film won the VPRO Tiger Award (shared with Daniele Gaglianone's Changing Destiny and Mercedes Álvarez's The Sky Turns) at the 34th International Film Festival Rotterdam.

References

External links 
 
 
 Julia Vassilieva ROUGE review

2004 films
2004 drama films
Films about cloning
Russian drama films
2000s Russian-language films